Eduard Tiiman (1888 – ?) was an Estonian politician. He was a member of II Riigikogu. He was a member of the Riigikogu since 9 April 1924. He replaced Adolf Zillmer. On 17 May, he was removed from his position and he was replaced by Rudolf Pächter.

References

1888 births
Year of death missing
Workers' United Front politicians
Members of the Riigikogu, 1923–1926